The first government of Mariano Rajoy was formed on 22 December 2011, following the latter's election as Prime Minister of Spain by the Congress of Deputies on 20 December and his swearing-in on 21 December, as a result of the People's Party (PP) emerging as the largest parliamentary force at the 2011 Spanish general election.

The cabinet comprised members of the PP and a number of independents. It was automatically dismissed on 21 December 2015 as a consequence of the 2015 general election, but remained in acting capacity until the next government was sworn in.

Investiture

Cabinet changes
Rajoy's first government saw a number of cabinet changes during its tenure:
On 28 April 2014, Miguel Arias Cañete stepped down as Minister of Agriculture, Food and Environmental Affairs in order to run as the People's Party (PP)'s leading candidate in the 2014 European Parliament election. He was succeeded by Isabel García Tejerina.
On 23 September 2014, Alberto Ruiz-Gallardón resigned as Minister of Justice, after the government chose to withdraw his proposed abortion bill. The decision was said to come over the loss of personal prestige resulting from a staunch defense of the bill, with Rajoy's u-turn on the issue being seen as a personal disavowal of Gallardón. Soraya Sáenz de Santamaría was tasked with the ordinary discharge of duties of the Ministry for Justice until Gallardon's successor, Rafael Catalá, could take office on 29 September 2014.
On 26 November 2014, Ana Mato resigned as Minister of Health, Social Services and Equality due to her involvement in the Gürtel case, after she was summoned to court as a "participant on a lucrative basis" in the corruption crimes allegedly committed by former husband Jesús Sepúlveda. Her resignation came one day before a plenary in Congress on corruption in which Prime Minister Rajoy was scheduled to intervene, and after Mato herself had announced earlier that day that she had not considered her resignation. Sáenz de Santamaría took on the ordinary discharge of duties of the ministry until Mato's successor, Alfonso Alonso, could take office on 3 December 2014.
On 26 June 2015, Íñigo Méndez de Vigo replaced José Ignacio Wert as Minister of Education, Culture and Sports, after the latter had expressed his wish to retire from politics.

From 21 December 2015, Rajoy's cabinet took on acting duties for the duration of the government formation process resulting from the 2015 general election. This lasted for  days and saw a new general election being held in the meantime. A number of ministers renounced their posts throughout this period, with the ordinary discharge of duties of their ministries being transferred to other cabinet members as a result of Rajoy being unable to appoint replacements while in acting role.

On 15 April 2016, José Manuel Soria was forced to renounce his post as acting Minister of Industry, Energy and Tourism over his involvement in the Panama Papers scandal, owing to the leaking of information revealing that he and his family had maintained several offshore societies on tax havens during the previous decades, as well as his confusing and changing explanations on the issue. Luis de Guindos, acting Minister of Economy and Competitiveness, took on the ordinary discharge of duties of Soria's vacant ministry.
On 19 July 2016, Ana Pastor was elected President of the Congress of Deputies of the XII Legislature, a position incompatible with her post as acting Minister of Development. Rafael Catalá, acting Minister of Justice, took on the ordinary discharge of duties of Pastor's vacant ministry.
On 16 August 2016, Alfonso Alonso renounced his position as acting Minister of Health, Social Services and Equality in order to run as the PP candidate for Lehendakari in the 2016 Basque regional election. Fátima Báñez, acting Minister of Employment and Social Security, took on the ordinary discharge of duties of Alonso's vacant ministry.

Council of Ministers
The Council of Ministers was structured into the offices for the prime minister, the deputy prime minister, 13 ministries and the post of the spokesperson of the Government.

Departmental structure
Mariano Rajoy's first government was organised into several superior and governing units, whose number, powers and hierarchical structure varied depending on the ministerial department.

Unit/body rank
() Secretary of state
() Undersecretary
() Director-general
() Autonomous agency
() Military & intelligence agency

Notes

References

External links
Governments of Spain 2011–present. Ministers of Mariano Rajoy and Pedro Sánchez. Historia Electoral.com (in Spanish).
The governments of the second period of the People's Party Party (since 2011) (under Juan Carlos I). Lluís Belenes i Rodríguez History Page (in Spanish).
The governments of the second period of the People's Party Party (since 2011) (under Felipe VI). Lluís Belenes i Rodríguez History Page (in Spanish).

2011 establishments in Spain
2016 disestablishments in Spain
Cabinets established in 2011
Cabinets disestablished in 2016
Council of Ministers (Spain)